Euphaea masoni is a species of damselfly in the family Euphaeidae, the gossamerwings.

Description
The male is almost entirely black, including its wings. The female has lighter colored wings.

Range
Euphaea masoni is found mostly in Southeast Asia, including southern China, India, Laos, Myanmar, Thailand, Vietnam.

Ecology
It is found near streams. Phoretic associations between larvae of Nanocladius asiaticus (Diptera, Chironomidae) and Euphaea masoni have been reported.

References

External links

Euphaeidae
Insects described in 1879